Eduard Freiherr von Böhm-Ermolli (12 February 1856 – 9 December 1941) was an Austrian general during World War I who rose to the rank of field marshal in the Austro-Hungarian Army. He was the head of the Second Army and fought mainly on the front of Galicia during the entire conflict. On 30 October 1940, Böhm-Ermolli was made a German Generalfeldmarschall.

Biography

Early life
Eduard Böhm was born in the Italian city of Ancona where his father served with a small representative detachment of the Austrian army. His father, Georg Böhm (1813–1893), had as a sergeant won a battlefield commission for bravery after the battle of Novara in 1849, been promoted to the rank of major upon his retirement in 1877. In June 1885, he received permission to attach his wife's (Maria Josepha Ermolli) maiden name to his family name.  He was elevated to hereditary nobility in September 1885, and hence the family was known as "von Böhm-Ermolli".

Böhm-Ermolli was trained at the cadet academy in St. Pölten and the Theresian Military Academy in Wiener Neustadt and entered the service on 1 September 1875 as a lieutenant in the dragoons. He served in a variety of line and staff positions, steadily rose through the ranks, being promoted to General of the Cavalry on 1 May 1912 and appointed commanding general of the 1st Army Corps in Kraków.

Service during World War One
At the start of World War I, Böhm-Ermolli was given command of the Austrian 2nd Army, which was intended for action on the Serbian front. After the Russian Empire mobilised, the 2nd Army was diverted to the Russian front, where it reinforced the armies of Austria's German ally.
In September 1915 he also became commander of the Army Group Böhm-Ermolli which included the German South Army besides his own Second Army.

Böhm-Ermolli was promoted to Generaloberst in May 1916 and to Feldmarschall in January 1918. In March 1918, his forces occupied Ukraine. His Army Group was dissolved at Odessa at the war's end.

Later life

Böhm-Ermolli then settled in his home town of Troppau in Austrian Silesia, which became part of Czechoslovakia in 1919, and the government of Czechoslovakia paid him his pension and honored him as a General 1st Class in the reserve. In 1928 he became an "Army General" of Czechoslovakia, even though he never served in the Czechoslovak Army.

When the Sudetenland, the predominantly German settled regions along the fringes of Czechoslovakia, was annexed to Nazi Germany in 1938, he became a German subject. On
31 October 1940 Böhm-Ermolli received an honorary promotion to Generalfeldmarschall of the German Army. In addition, he was appointed honorary colonel-in-chief of Infantry Regiment 28 in his hometown of Troppau (Opava).

When he died in December 1941, he was accorded a state funeral with full military honors in Vienna.

Military service and promotion record

 Cadet, Austrian Military Academy at Wiener Neustadt, Class of 1875
 Leutnant, K.u.K. Dragoon Regiment Nr 4, 1875
 served as a general staff officer, 1870s to 1890s
 Oberst (Colonel), K.u.K., 1897
 General-Major, 1903
 Commander, 16th Cavalry Brigade
 Commander of a cavalry division
 Feldmarschall-Leutnant, K.u.K., 1907
 Commander in chief, K.u.K. 1st Army Corps, November 18, 1911
 General der Kavallerie, K.u.K., May 1, 1912
 Commander in chief, K.u.K. 2nd Army
 General-Oberst, K.u.K., May 1, 1916
 Commander, Army Group "Böhm-Ermolli", 1916 to 1918
 Feldmarschall, K.u.K., January 31, 1918
 Commander of occupied Ukraine, to June 17, 1918

Retired, December 1, 1918.

 (honorary) Generalfeldmarschall, Wehrmacht, 1940

Decorations and awards

:
 Royal Hungarian Order of St. Stephen – Grand Cross, 1918 (#1687)
 Military Merit Cross – I. Class Cross with War Decoration 
 Order of Leopold – Grand Cross, with War Decoration & Swords
 Order of the Iron Crown – Knight, I. Class, with War Decoration
 Military Order of Maria Theresa – Commander 
 Decoration for Services to the Red Cross – Star of Honor
 Order of the Iron Crown – Knight, III. Class 
 Military Merit Cross – III. Class Cross
 Military Merit Medal (Signum Laudis) – in Gold
 Military Merit Medal (Signum Laudis) – in Silver
 Officer’s Long Service Cross, III. Class (25+ years of service)
 1898 Jubilee Medal (Emperor Franz Joseph I. Golden Jubilee) 

:
 Military Merit Order – Knight, Grand Cross 

:
 Iron Cross, 2nd Class
 Iron Cross, 1st Class
 Pour le Mérite
 Oakleaves to the Pour le Mérite

:
 Ottoman War Medal (“Gallipoli Star”)
 Liyakat (Merit) Medal
 Imtiyaz (Honor) Medal

Notes

1856 births
1941 deaths
People from Ancona
Field marshals of Austria
Austro-Hungarian Army officers
Austro-Hungarian military personnel of World War I
Field marshals of Nazi Germany
Barons of Austria
Austrian expatriates in Italy
Silesian nobility
Czechoslovak military personnel
Commanders Cross of the Military Order of Maria Theresa
Grand Crosses of the Order of Saint Stephen of Hungary
Recipients of the Pour le Mérite (military class)
Recipients of the Iron Cross, 1st class
Grand Crosses of the Military Merit Order (Bavaria)
Theresian Military Academy alumni